Kenniff is an Irish surname originating in County Kilkenny, Ireland.

People named Kenniff include:
Keith Kenniff, American musician
Patrick Kenniff and James Kenniff, criminals in Australia
Sean Kenniff, American doctor and reality show contestant

Surnames of Irish origin